The 2015 North American Soccer League season was the 48th season of Division II soccer in the United States and the fifth season of the North American Soccer League. It was contested by eleven teams including two from Canada. Jacksonville Armada FC made their NASL debut this season. The defending Soccer Bowl champions were the San Antonio Scorpions, while Minnesota United FC were the defending North American Supporters' Trophy winners. A split season format was used for the 2015 season.

Teams, stadiums, and personnel

Stadiums and locations

Personnel and sponsorship

Player transfers

Managerial changes

Spring season 

The Spring season began on April 4 and ended on June 13.  The schedule featured a single round robin format with each team playing every other team in the league a single time. Each team hosted 5 home games and played 5 road games. The winner of the Spring season earned one of four berths in the playoffs, known as The Championship.

Standings

Results

Fall season 
The Fall season began on July 4 and ended on November 1. The schedule featured each team playing every other team in the league once at home and once away. The winner of the Fall season earned one of four berths in The Championship.

Standings

Results

Playoffs 
The Championship, culminating with Soccer Bowl 2015, was contested by the winners of the spring and fall seasons hosting the next best two teams in the full year regular season table. The half-season champions earned the No. 1 and No. 2 seeds, with the higher seed going to the team with the better full-season record.  The two next-best teams earned the No. 3 and No. 4 seeds. The semi-finals had the No. 1 seed hosting the No. 4 seed and the No. 2 seed hosting the No. 3 seed.  The winners met in the Soccer Bowl 2015 hosted by the team with the higher seed.

Combined standings

The Championship

Participants
 New York Cosmos (Spring season champion)
 Ottawa Fury (Fall season champion)
 Minnesota United
 Fort Lauderdale Strikers

Bracket

Semifinals

Soccer Bowl 2015

Attendance 

Source: NASL

Statistical leaders

Top scorers 

Source:

Top assists 

Source:

|}

Clean sheets

Source: NASL

Hat-tricks

|}

Awards

Monthly awards

Weekly awards

League awards

 Golden Ball (MVP):  Stefano Pinho (Fort Lauderdale Strikers) 
Golden Boot: Stefano Pinho (Fort Lauderdale Strikers) 
 Golden Glove: Romuald Peiser (Ottawa Fury) 
 Coach of the Year: Marc Dos Santos (Ottawa Fury) 
 Goal of the Year: Junior Burgos (Atlanta Silverbacks) 
 Young (U24) Player of the Year: Leo Fernandes (New York Cosmos) 
 Humanitarian of the Year: Drew Beckie (Ottawa Fury) 
 Fair Play Award: Ottawa Fury

References

External links
 

 
North American Soccer League seasons
North American Soccer League season